Victor Magtanggol is a 2018 Philippine fantasy-action series starring Alden Richards, Andrea Torres, Janine Gutierrez and John Estrada. The series premiered on GMA Network's GMA Telebabad evening block and worldwide via GMA Pinoy TV from July 30 to November 16, 2018, replacing The Cure.

NUTAM (Nationwide Urban Television Audience Measurement) People in Television Homes ratings are provided by AGB Nielsen Philippines.

Series overview

Episodes

July 2018

August 2018

September 2018

October 2018

November 2018

References

Lists of Philippine drama television series episodes